Blindbothel is a civil parish in the Borough of Allerdale in Cumbria, England.  It contains eleven listed buildings that are recorded in the National Heritage List for England.  All the listed buildings are designated at Grade II, the lowest of the three grades, which is applied to "buildings of national importance and special interest".  The parish is almost entirely rural, and most of the listed buildings are houses, cottages, farmhouses, and farm buildings dating from the 17th and 18th centuries.  The other listed buildings are a church and a bridge.


Buildings

References

Citations

Sources

Lists of listed buildings in Cumbria